Sir Thomas Chapman, 2nd Baronet (20 October 1756 - 22 December 1837) was an Anglo-Irish landowner.

He was educated at Trinity College, Dublin. He succeeded to the baronetcy on the death of his brother Sir Benjamin Chapman, 1st Baronet in August 1810. He died in 1837 and was succeeded by his son Sir Montagu Lowther Chapman, 3rd Baronet, who became the MP for Westmeath and its High Sheriff.

References

1756 births
1837 deaths
18th-century Anglo-Irish people
19th-century Anglo-Irish people
Baronets in the Baronetage of Ireland
Alumni of Trinity College Dublin
People from County Westmeath
Chapman baronets